Belite Brezi,(Bulgarian:Белите Брези or Бели Брези:Beli Brezi) is a natural reserve in Rhodopes. This is one of the places with the most developed tourism in the area. On the territory of the reserve was built holiday house with a total capacity of about 250 beds. The reserve was created to protect the only naturally growing forest of white birch in the Rhodopes. Forests of betula pendula are rare for Bulgaria and the main areas covered in this species are artificially planted. The reserve has an area of about 3680 acres. Furthermore, birch Reserve also met and species beech, scots pine, pinus nigra, picea abies and others, but they are under-represented.

References

Rhodope_Mountains
Nature_reserves_in_Bulgaria